Raipur Nangli is a village in Khatauli tehsil, Muzaffarnagar district, Uttar Pradesh state in India. Nearby towns and cities include Sardhana, Hastinapur and Meerut.

The village is on the border of the Muzaffarnagar and Meerut districts.

References

Villages in Muzaffarnagar district